The Cathedral Vidya School, Lonavala is a co-educational English-medium international residential School. It is an affiliate of the 150-year-old Cathedral and John Connon School in Mumbai. However, it consists of its own management and staff and it follows its own philosophy, aims, objectives, academic and administrative systems which have been adapted for a co-ed boarding school.

The Academic Programme 
The School offers :
. Classes  4 – 8  (British National Curriculum)  - British National Curriculum 
. Classes  9 - 10 (IGCSE) - International General Certificate of Secondary Education
. Classes 11 – 12  (IBDP)  - International Baccalaureate Diploma Programme

The Developmental Activities Programme 
The School offers activities like Pottery, Sculpture, Western and Indian Music, Photography, Horse Riding, Computer Club in the school or through the school on off-campus sites. While co-curricular activities are woven into the mainstream time-table, hobbies, societies and clubs (Maths, Nature, History, Science, Chess, Cookery, Gardening, Debating, Elocution, Dramatics, Journalism, Paper Recycling and Craft) are pursued during the children’s spare time through student driven programs.

The Residential Programme 
The School has separate residences for girls and boys. Grouped class-wise,  eight children sleep together in a bedroom with an attached study. Every floor has accommodation for House Parents and recreation areas with TV which the students can watch for an hour per day during non-examination periods. However music systems are strictly forbidden, but students are allowed to carry an mp3 player as long as it is audio only.

The students are not allowed entry into the residency buildings between 8:00 AM to 4:30 PM and from 5:00 PM to 8:00 PM. During this time the students are supposed to be engaged in other activities in the school building.

A boarding system is followed whereby students from nearby locations are allowed to spend the weekend at home every month as long as their academic work is satisfactory. Students with unsatisfactory academic work are not permitted to leave the campus until they complete their assignments.

An infirmary managed by a local Nursing student who stays at school during the night. The School also has arrangements with a hospital for medical emergencies in Lonavala.

The House System 
There are four houses in the School - Thomas, Palmer, Savage and Wilson - named after four founders of the Mother School. Students are equitably distributed between these houses, and each is headed by a House Master/Mistress (selected from among the teaching staff). House wise activities are organized on regular intervals to encourage students to work in a team. The school encourage students to work together and to work for the victory of their houses. Overall, this encourages team-work within the student body and it contributes to the building of key friendships within the houses especially.

Leadership Development and Student Governance 
Student leaders totally not appointed to the Prefectorial Council at the beginning of the term.  This Council consists of the Head Boy, the Head Girl and Prefects who effectively help with disciplinary issues.  Special ties and sashes are worn to distinguish the prefects. 
A democratic forum called the Student Council is also formed wherein students meet on a regular basis to discuss day-to-day issues directly affecting them. The Council members are elected democratically and they do serve as a link between the School administration and student body.

References

External links
Official website of the Cathedral Vidya School
Official website of the Cathedral and John Connon School

Educational institutions established in 2008
Schools in Maharashtra
Lonavala-Khandala
Buildings and structures in Lonavala-Khandala
2008 establishments in Maharashtra